The Monument to Ferdinand I was a prominent monument in Chişinău, Moldova. 

The building of the monument was decided at a meeting held in Chişinău on 16 January 1937 and led by Gherman Pântea and Elefterie Sinicliu. 

It was located on an axis aligned with the Triumphal Arch and Chișinău Cathedral, whereby the statue of the king faced the cathedral.

References

External links
 Vigoarea Basarabiei interbelice (1937 - 1939)

1939 sculptures
Monuments and memorials in Chișinău
1939 in Romania
Bronze sculptures in Moldova